Aditya Chola I (Tamil: ஆதித்த சோழன்) (c. 870/71 – c. 907 CE), the son of Vijayalaya Chola, was the Chola king who laid the foundation of the Imperial Chola Empire by the conquest of the Pallavas and occupied the Western Ganga Kingdom. Aditya Chola I was succeeded by his eldest son Parantaka Chola I.

Relations with the Cheras  
Friendly relations appear to have existed between the Cheras (the Perumals) and the Cholas during the reign of Aditya I. The Chera contemporary Sthanu Ravi was a partner in Chola king Rajakesari Varma's campaign in Kongu country (central Tamil Nadu). King Rajakesari Varma can be identified either with Aditya or Srikantha Chola.

It is known that Aditya I's son, Parantaka I, married a Chera princess (the Kizhan Adikal).

References 

 Tamil And Sanskrit Inscriptions Chiefly Collected in 1886-87, E. Hultzsch, PhD, Published by Archaeological Survey of India, New Delhi
 Nilakanta Sastri, K. A. (1935). The CōĻas, University of Madras, Madras (Reprinted 1984).
 Nilakanta Sastri, K. A. (1955). A History of South India, OUP, New Delhi (Reprinted 2002).

Chola kings
870s births
900s deaths
Year of birth uncertain
Year of death uncertain
9th-century Hindus
10th-century Hindus
9th-century Indian monarchs
10th-century Indian monarchs